State Road 281 (SR 281), known locally as Avalon Boulevard, is a north–south highway in Santa Rosa County, Florida.  It runs from U.S. Highway 98 (Gulf Breeze Parkway) east of Gulf Breeze north to U.S. Highway 90 just west of Milton.  The portion of the road south of Interstate 10 is signed "TOLL 281" to reflect the inclusion of the Garcon Point Bridge, which has a $5.00 per crossing toll.

The primary function of SR 281 is as a bypass route of Pensacola, connecting Milton, Gulf Breeze, Pensacola Beach and other communities along the coast to I-10.

Major intersections

References

External links

281
281